Volodymyr Samborskyi (born 29 August 1985, in Ukrainian SSR, Soviet Union) is a professional Ukrainian football defender.

See also
 2005 FIFA World Youth Championship squads#Ukraine

External links 
Official Website Profile

1985 births
Living people
Ukrainian footballers
Ukraine under-21 international footballers
Ukraine youth international footballers
Ukrainian Premier League players
FC Metalist Kharkiv players
FC Kharkiv players
Association football defenders
Sportspeople from Cherkasy Oblast